The 2013 Cheez-It 355 at The Glen was a NASCAR Sprint Cup Series stock car race that was held on August 11 at Watkins Glen International in Watkins Glen, New York. Contested over 90 laps on the 2.45-mile (4.023  km) road course, it was the twenty-second race of the 2013 NASCAR Sprint Cup Series season. Kyle Busch of Joe Gibbs Racing won the race, his third of the season, while Brad Keselowski finished second. Martin Truex Jr., Carl Edwards and Juan Pablo Montoya rounded out the top five.

This is the first NASCAR race since the 1998 NAPA 500 without 5-Time Watkins Glen winner Tony Stewart on the grid.

Report

Background

Watkins Glen International is one of two road courses to hold NASCAR races, the other being Sonoma Raceway. Marcos Ambrose was the defending race winner after winning the race in 2011 and 2012.

On August 6, it was announced that Tony Stewart would not be participating after breaking both bones in his right leg in a Sprint car accident at Southern Iowa Speedway in Oskaloosa, Iowa, on the night of August 5. Instead, road racing veteran Max Papis would step in and replace Stewart for the Watkins Glen event, with future drivers to be decided for the next four or five oval races. This marked the first race since his debut in the 1999 Daytona 500 that a Sprint Cup race did not have Stewart in the field, ending a streak of 521 straight starts for Stewart.

Practice and qualifying

Qualifying order
Source:

Group 1

Group 2

Group 3

Group 4

Group 5

Group 6

Group 7

Group 8

Race

Start
The race was scheduled to start at 1:18 p.m. EDT, Marcos Ambrose led the field to the green flag on lap 1.

1st caution, restart and wreck
The first caution came out on lap 15 for a crash by Jeff Gordon in the back straightaway, the race restarted on lap 19, a couple of laps later, the second caution came out for a multi-car crash in the straightaway, by lap 41, the race was red flagged for seven minutes for cleanup on the track, the race restarted on lap 43.

Quarter mark
The third caution came out when Kyle Busch spun into the tires, and was out of gas, the race restarted on lap 63, A couple of laps later, the fourth caution came out for a wreck again on lap 80, some cars were involved in the crash, the race restarted on lap 86, and the fifth caution came out on lap 85 for a crash by Marcos Ambrose, The race restarted on lap 88, and Kyle Busch won his race at Watkins-Glen.

Results

Qualifying

Race results

Notes

  Points include 3 Chase for the Sprint Cup points for winning, 1 point for leading a lap, and 1 point for most laps led.
  Ineligible for drivers' championship points.

Standings after the race

Drivers' championship standings

Manufacturers' championship standings

Note: Only the first ten positions are included for the driver standings.

References

Cheez-It 355 at The Glen
Cheez-It 355 at The Glen
Cheez-It 355 at The Glen
NASCAR races at Watkins Glen International